The 2022–23 St. Bonaventure Bonnies men's basketball team represented St. Bonaventure University during the 2022–23 NCAA Division I men's basketball season. The Bonnies, led by 16th-year head coach Mark Schmidt, played their home games at the Reilly Center in Olean, New York as members of the Atlantic 10 Conference.

Previous season
The Bonnies finished the 2021–22 season 23–10, 12–5 in A-10 play to finish in fourth place. They lost in the quarterfinals of the A-10 tournament to Saint Louis. They received an at-large bid to the National Invitation Tournament where they defeated Colorado, Oklahoma, and Virginia to advance to the semifinals. There they lost to Xavier.

The Bonnies were ranked No. 24 in the preseason AP poll, the first time they had ever been ranked in the preseason AP poll.

Offseason

Departures

Incoming transfers

Recruiting classes

2022 recruiting class

2023 recruiting class

Roster

Schedule and results

|-
!colspan=12 style=| Exhibition

|-
!colspan=12 style=| Non-conference regular season

|-
!colspan=12 style=| A-10 regular season

|-
!colspan=12 style=| A-10 tournament

Source

References

St. Bonaventure Bonnies men's basketball seasons
St. Bonaventure
2022 in sports in New York (state)
2023 in sports in New York (state)